Karin Donckers (born 28 May 1971) is a Belgian equestrian who competes in eventing. She has competed at six Olympic Games between 1992 and 2016 (only missing 1996). Her best result was fourth place in the team competition in 1992. She has also twice finished in the top ten of the individual competition, with eighth in 1992 and ninth in 2008.

References

1971 births
Living people
Belgian female equestrians
Olympic equestrians of Belgium
Equestrians at the 1992 Summer Olympics
Equestrians at the 2000 Summer Olympics
Equestrians at the 2004 Summer Olympics
Equestrians at the 2008 Summer Olympics
Equestrians at the 2012 Summer Olympics
Equestrians at the 2016 Summer Olympics
21st-century Belgian women